Jevon Mills (born 27 September 2003) is a professional footballer who plays as a centre-back for Solihull Moors on loan from EFL Championship club Hull City. Born in England, he is a youth international for the Republic of Ireland.

Career
Mills is youth product of Hull City, having joined as a U13. He signed his first professional contract with the club on 7 October 2021. He made his professional debut with Hull City in a 1–0 EFL Championship win over Cardiff City on 24 November 2021.

On 27 January 2022, Mills joined Falkirk on loan until the end of the 2021–22 season.

On 1 September 2022, Mills joined Gateshead on loan until January 2023.

On 10 February 2023, Mills joined Solihull Moors on a 28-day loan spell, this was extended for a further month on 13 March 2023.

International career
Born in England, Mills is of Irish descent. He captained the Republic of Ireland U19s in October 2021.

References

External links
 

2003 births
Living people
Footballers from Nottingham
Republic of Ireland international footballers
Republic of Ireland youth international footballers
English footballers
English people of Irish descent
Association football defenders
Hull City A.F.C. players
Falkirk F.C. players
Gateshead F.C. players
Solihull Moors F.C. players
English Football League players
Scottish Professional Football League players
National League (English football) players